Jules Benjamin Jeanmard (August 15, 1879 – February 23, 1957), was an American prelate of the Roman Catholic Church. He served as the first bishop of the new Diocese of Lafayette in Louisiana from 1918 to 1956.

Biography

Early life
Jules Jeanmard was born in Breaux Bridge, Louisiana, to Jules and Frances Maria (née Brown) Jeanmard. He received his early education at the parochial school of St. Bernard Parish in Breaux Bridge. He then attended St. Joseph Seminary in Gessen, Louisiana and Our Lady of Holy Cross College in New Orleans. He studied for the priesthood at St. Louis Diocesan Seminary in New Orleans and at Kenrick Seminary in St. Louis, Missouri.

Priestly ministry
Jeanmard was ordained a priest for the Archdiocese of New Orleans on June 10, 1903. His first assignment was as a curate at St. Louis Cathedral, where he served through the yellow fever epidemic of 1905. He served as secretary to Archbishop James Blenk from 1906 to 1914, and chancellor of the archdiocese from 1914 to 1917. He also served as vicar general for spiritual affairs of the archdiocese. Following the death of Archbishop Blenk, he served as apostolic administrator of New Orleans from 1917 to 1918. He then served as apostolic administrator of the newly erected Diocese of Lafayette.

Bishop of Lafayette
On July 18, 1918, Jeanmard was appointed the first bishop of the Diocese of Lafayette by Pope Benedict XV. He received his episcopal consecration on December 8, 1918, from Archbishop Giovanni Bonzano, with Bishops Theophile Meerschaert and John Laval serving as co-consecrators. He was the first native Louisianan to become a Catholic bishop.

During his 38-year tenure, Jeanmard established Immaculata Seminary, St. Mary's Orphan Home, Our Lady of the Oaks Retreat House, the Catholic Student Center at the University of Southwestern Louisiana, a retreat wing of the Most Holy Sacrament Convent, a Carmelite monastery, and numerous schools and churches. He encouraged diocesan-sponsored television programs, religious radio programs in both English and French, and a diocesan newspaper The Southwest Louisiana Register. Jeanmard also issued pastoral letters in support of the rights of labor to organize. In 1943, he was named an assistant at the pontifical throne by Pope Pius XII.

In March 1923, when the citizens of Lafayette were on the verge of rioting following a public reading of members of the Ku Klux Klan, Jeanmard encouraged the people to return to their homes. In 1934, he welcomed the first African-American priests into the diocese. Jeanmard also established a number of separate parishes for African-Americans, whom he did not want intimidated or infringed upon by whites. With financial assistance from Katharine Drexel, he helped establish a number of rural parochial schools for African-Americans. In 1952, he became the first bishop in the Deep South to ordain an African-American man to diocesan priesthood when he conferred holy orders upon Louis Ledoux. In November 1955, Jeanmard excommunicated two women in Erath, Louisiana, after they beat another woman who taught an integrated catechism class.

Retirement and legacy 
On March 13, 1956, Jeanmard retired as Bishop of Lafayette; he was appointed titular bishop of Bareta by Pope Pius XII on the same date. He later died at a hospital in Lake Charles, at age 77. He is interred at St. John Cathedral in Lafayette.

Notes

1879 births
1957 deaths
People from Breaux Bridge, Louisiana
Roman Catholic Archdiocese of New Orleans
People from Lafayette, Louisiana
Saint Joseph Seminary College alumni
Our Lady of Holy Cross College alumni
Roman Catholic bishops in Louisiana
20th-century Roman Catholic bishops in the United States
African-American Roman Catholicism